The Ambassador of the Philippines to South Korea is an officer of the Philippine Department of Foreign Affairs and the head of the Embassy of the Philippines to the Republic of Korea. The position has the rank and status of an Ambassador Extraordinary and Plenipotentiary.

List of representatives

Ministers
 Tomas de Castro, 11 May 1954 - 1956
 Cosme P. Garcia, 1956−1957

Ambassadors
 Eduardo T. Quintero, 25 July 1958 - 1960
 Juan M. Arreglado, 1960−1963
 Pedro L. Ramirez, July 1964 - 12 April 1968
 Benjamin T. Tirona, 10 May 1968 - 1 April 1979
 Nicanor T. Jimenez, 18 January 1980 - 15 April 1985
 Tomas R. Padilla, 19 January 1986 - 31 December 1990
 Raul Ch. Rabe, 23 April 1992 - 7 April 1993
 Francisco L. Benedicto, 14 June 1993 - 16 May 1995
 Ernesto S. Gidaya, 8 January 1996 - 31 August 1998
 Juanito P. Jarasa, 21 May 1999 - 12 June 2003
 Aladin G. Villacorte, 30 September 2003 - 31 June 2005
 Susan O. Castrence, 27 January 2006 - 20 January 2008
 Luis T. Cruz, 15 February 2008 - 7 February 2014
 Raul S. Hernandez, 28 May 2014 - 30 April 2019
 Noe Wong, 2019−2020
 Maria Theresa B. Dizon-De Vega, 15 October 2021 - present

See also
List of ambassadors of South Korea to the Philippines
Foreign relations of the Philippines
Foreign relations of South Korea

References

External links
Primary and official website of the Embassy of the Philippines, Seoul
Secondary/Alternate website of the Embassy of the Philippines, Seoul

Philippines–South Korea relations
Philippines
South Korea